Erythrolamprus pseudoreginae , the Tobago stream snake, is a species of snake in the family Colubridae. The species is found in Tobago.

References

Erythrolamprus
Reptiles of Trinidad and Tobago
Endemic fauna of Trinidad and Tobago
Reptiles described in 2019